Kim Hyung-tae (born September 1, 1997) is a South Korean pair skater. With his sister, Kim Su-yeon, he is the 2017 Asian Open Figure Skating Trophy champion, the 2017 Toruń Cup silver medalist and the 2017 South Korean national silver medalist. They competed at the 2017 Four Continents Championships.

Career 
Kim Hyung-tae began learning to skate in 2010. He and his sister, Kim Su-yeon, started competing as a pair in the 2015–2016 season. Their international debut came in February 2016 at the Winter Youth Olympics in Hamar, Norway. The pair finished 8th at the event.

The Kim siblings debuted on the Junior Grand Prix series in September 2016, placing 13th in Ostrava, Czech Republic, and 8th in Saransk, Russia. Making their senior debut, they finished 7th at the 2016 CS Ondrej Nepela Memorial a couple of weeks later. In early January 2017, the pair obtained the silver medal at the South Korean Championships, having placed third in the short program and first in the free skate. Later in the same month, they received their first senior international medal, winning silver at the Toruń Cup in Toruń, Poland. In February, the siblings competed at their first ISU Championship — the 2017 Four Continents Championships in Gangneung, South Korea. They finished 12th at the event.

Programs 
(with Kim Su-yeon)

Competitive highlights 
CS: Challenger Series; JGP: Junior Grand Prix

With Kim Su-yeon

Detailed results

References

External links 
 

1997 births
South Korean male pair skaters
Living people
People from Gwacheon
Figure skaters at the 2016 Winter Youth Olympics
Figure skaters at the 2017 Asian Winter Games
Sportspeople from Gyeonggi Province